Zhang Dingcheng (December 1898 – December 16, 1981) was a politician of the People's Republic of China, Procurator–General of the Supreme People's Procuratorate from 1954 to 1975.  His tenure remains the longest in the history of the Supreme Procuratorate.

Biography
Zhang Dingcheng was born in Yongding County, Fujian in 1898. He graduated as a schoolteacher from the teachers college of Dapu County, Guangdong, and taught at primary schools. While teaching at the Qingxi Baoxu Temple primary school in Dapu County, he discovered Marxism, participated in revolutionary activities and joined the Communist Party of China in 1927. 

He commanded units of the Chinese Red Army (predecessor of the People's Liberation Army), studied at the Central Party School and took part in the Long March, accompanying Mao to Yan'an. Zhang fought in both the Second Sino–Japanese War and, after the Japanese surrender, the Chinese Civil War that resulted in a Communist victory and the establishment of the People's Republic of China.

From 1949 to 1954, Zhang served as Governor and Communist Party Secretary of Fujian Province. In 1954 he became Procurator–General of the Supreme People's Procuratorate, holding that post for a record 21 years. During the Cultural Revolution he was publicly denounced by some Red Guard groups, but his loyalty to Mao ensured that he remained in his place. Nevertheless, the 1975 Constitution, adopted a year before Mao's death, abolished the position of the Procurator–General (it was restored three years later, in 1978).

Following the temporary abolition of the office of the Procurator–General in 1975, Zhang was elected a Vice Chairman of the National People's Congress, holding that office until his death in December 1981, at the age of 83.

References

External links
 Biography of Zhang Dingcheng

1898 births
1981 deaths
Governors of Fujian
People from Yongding District, Longyan
Chinese politicians of Hakka descent
People's Republic of China politicians from Fujian
Chinese Communist Party politicians from Fujian
Politicians from Longyan
Vice Chairpersons of the National People's Congress
Procurator-General of the Supreme People's Procuratorate